Monselice railway station is a railway station serving the town of Monselice, in the Veneto region, northeastern Italy.

The station opened in 1866 and lies on the Padua–Bologna and Mantova–Monselice railway lines.

Train services
The following services call at the station:

Intercity services (Intercity) Rome - Florence - Bologna - Padua - Venice - Trieste
Night train (Intercity Night) Rome - Bologna - Padua - Venice - Trieste
Express services (Regionale Veloce) Bologna - Ferrara - Rovigo - Padua - Venice
Regional services (Treno regionale) Bologna - Ferrara - Rovigo - Padua - Venice
Local services (Treno regionale) Mantua - Nogara - Legnago - Monselice (- Venice)

See also

History of rail transport in Italy
List of railway stations in Veneto
Rail transport in Italy
Railway stations in Italy

References

External links

This article is presently being translated from the Italian language version.

Railway stations in Veneto
Railway stations opened in 1866
1866 establishments in the Austrian Empire